The 1986 Yale Bulldogs football team represented Yale University in the 1986 NCAA Division I-AA football season.  The Bulldogs were led by 22nd-year head coach Carmen Cozza, played their home games at the Yale Bowl and finished in sixth place in the Ivy League with a 2–5 record, 3–7 overall.

Schedule

References

Yale
Yale Bulldogs football seasons
Yale Bulldogs football